The concept of God in Abrahamic religions is centred on monotheism. The three major monotheistic religions of Judaism, Christianity, and Islam, alongside the Baháʼí Faith, Samaritanism, Druze, and Rastafari, are all regarded as Abrahamic religions due to their shared worship of the God (referred to as Yahweh in Hebrew and as Allah in Arabic) that these traditions claim revealed himself to Abraham. Abrahamic religions share the same distinguishing features:
all of their theological traditions are to some extent influenced by the depiction of the God of Israel in the Hebrew Bible;
all of them trace their roots to Abraham as a common patriarch.

The Abrahamic god in this sense is the conception of God that remains a common feature of all Abrahamic religions. God is conceived of as one, eternal, omnipotent, omniscient, and the creator of the universe. God is typically referred to with masculine grammatical articles only, and further held to have the properties of holiness, justice, omnibenevolence and omnipresence. Proponents of Abrahamic faiths believe that God is also transcendent, meaning that he is outside of both space and time and therefore not subject to anything within his creation, but at the same time a personal God, involved, listening to prayer, and reacting to the actions of his creatures.

Opinions differ among scholars of religion on whether Mormonism belongs within the traditions of Christianity or whether it amounts to a distinct Abrahamic religion. The heterogenous Rastafari movement with roots in Jamaica is classified by some scholars as an international socio-religious movement, and by others as a separate Abrahamic religion or new religious movement.

Judaism

Judaism, the oldest Abrahamic religion, is based on a strict, exclusive monotheism, finding its origins in the sole veneration of Yahweh, the predecessor to the Abrahamic conception of God. The names of God used most often in the Hebrew Bible are the Tetragrammaton and Elohim. Jews traditionally do not pronounce it, and instead refer to God as HaShem, literally "the Name". In prayer, the Tetragrammaton is substituted with the pronunciation Adonai, meaning "My Lord". This is referred to primarily in the Torah: "Hear O Israel: the LORD is our God, the LORD is One".

God is conceived as unique and perfect, free from all faults, deficiencies, and defects, and further held to be omnipotent, omnipresent, omniscient, and completely infinite in all of his attributes, who has no partner or equal, being the sole creator of everything in existence. In Judaism, God is never portrayed in any image. The idea of God as a duality or trinity is heretical in Judaism—it's considered akin to polytheism. The Torah specifically forbade ascribing partners to share his singular sovereignty, as he is considered to be the absolute one without a second, indivisible, and incomparable being, who is similar to nothing and nothing is comparable to him. Thus, God is unlike anything in or of the world as to be beyond all forms of human thought and expression.

God in Judaism is conceived as anthropomorphic, unique, benevolent, eternal, the creator of the universe, and the ultimate source of morality. Thus, the term God corresponds to an actual ontological reality, and is not merely a projection of the human psyche. Traditional interpretations of Judaism generally emphasize that God is personal yet also transcendent and able to intervene in the world, while some modern interpretations of Judaism emphasize that God is an impersonal force or ideal rather than a supernatural being concerned with the universe.

Christianity

Christianity originated in 1st-century Judea from a sect of apocalyptic Jewish Christians within the realm of Second Temple Judaism, and thus shares most of its beliefs about God, including his omnipotence, omniscience, his role as creator of all things, his personality, immanence, transcendence and ultimate unity, with the innovation that Jesus of Nazareth is considered to be, in one way or another, the fulfillment of the ancient biblical prophecies about the Jewish Messiah, the completion of the Law of the prophets of Israel, the Son of God, and/or the incarnation of God himself as a human being.

Most Christian denominations believe Jesus to be the incarnated Son of God, which is the main theological divergence with respect to the exclusive monotheism of the other Abrahamic religions: Judaism, Samaritanism, the Baháʼí Faith, and Islam. Although personal salvation is implicitly stated in Judaism, personal salvation by grace and a recurring emphasis in orthodox theological beliefs is particularly emphasized in Christianity, often contrasting this with a perceived over-emphasis in law observance as stated in Jewish law, where it is contended that a belief in an intermediary between man and God or in the multiplicity of persons in the Godhead is against the Noahide laws, and thus not monotheistic.

In mainstream Christianity, theology and beliefs about God are enshrined in the doctrine of monotheistic Trinitarianism, which holds that the three persons of the trinity are distinct but all of the same indivisible essence, meaning that the Father is God, the Holy Spirit is God, and the Son is God, yet there is one God as there is one indivisible essence. These mainstream Christian doctrines were largely formulated at the Council of Nicaea and are enshrined in the Nicene Creed. The Trinitarian view emphasizes that God has a will, and that God the Son has two natures, divine and human, though these are never in conflict but joined in the hypostatic union.

Mormonism

In the belief system held by the Christian churches that adhere to the Latter Day Saint movement and most Mormon denominations, including the Church of Jesus Christ of Latter-day Saints (LDS Church), the term God refers to Elohim (God the Father), whereas Godhead means a council of three distinct gods: Elohim (the Eternal Father), Jehovah (God the Son, Jesus Christ), and the Holy Ghost, in a Non-trinitarian conception of the Godhead. The Father and Son have perfected, material bodies, while the Holy Ghost is a spirit and does not have a body. This differs significantly from mainstream Christian Trinitarianism; in Mormonism, the three persons are considered to be physically separate beings, or personages, but united in will and purpose. As such, the term Godhead differs from how it is used in mainstream Christianity. This description of God represents the orthodoxy of the LDS Church, established early in the 19th century.

Unitarianism
A small minority of Christians, largely coming under the heading of Unitarianism, hold Non-trinitarian conceptions of God.

Islam

In Islam, God (Allah) (lit. "the God") is the supreme being, all-powerful and all-knowing creator, sustainer, ordainer, and judge of the universe. Islam puts a heavy emphasis on the conceptualization of God as strictly singular (tawhid). He is considered to be unique (wahid) and inherently one (ahad), all-merciful and omnipotent. According to the Quran, there are 99 Names of God (al-asma al-husna, lit. meaning: "The best names") each of which evoke a distinct characteristic of God. All these names refer to Allah, considered to be the supreme and all-comprehensive divine Arabic name.  Among the 99 names of God, the most famous and most frequent of these names are "the Entirely Merciful" (al-Rahman) and "the Especially Merciful" (al-Rahim).

Islam rejects the doctrine of the Incarnation and the notion of a personal God as anthropomorphic, because it is seen as demeaning to the transcendence of God. The Quran prescribes the fundamental transcendental criterion in the following verses: "The Lord of the heavens and the earth and what is between them, so serve Him and be patient in His service. Do you know any one equal to Him?"; "(He is) the Creator of the heavens and the earth: there is nothing whatever like unto Him, and He is the One that hears and sees (all things)"; "And there is none comparable unto Him". Therefore, Islam strictly rejects all forms of anthropomorphism and anthropopathism of the concept of God, and thus categorically rejects the Christian concept of the Trinity or division of persons in the Godhead.

Muslims believe that Allah is the same God worshipped by the members of the Abrahamic religions that preceded Islam, i.e. Judaism and Christianity. Creation and ordering of the universe is seen as an act of prime mercy for which all creatures sing his glories and bear witness to his unity and lordship. According to the Quran: "No vision can grasp Him, but His grasp is over all vision. He is above all comprehension, yet is acquainted with all things". Similarly to Jews, Muslims explicitly reject the divinity of Jesus and don't believe in him as the incarnated God or Son of God, but instead consider him a human prophet and the promised Messiah sent by God, although the Islamic tradition itself is not unanimous on the question of Jesus' death and afterlife.

Baháʼí Faith

The writings of the Baháʼí Faith describe a monotheistic, personal, inaccessible, omniscient, omnipresent, imperishable, and almighty God who is the creator of all things in the universe. The existence of God and the universe is thought to be eternal, without a beginning or end.

Though transcendent and inaccessible directly, God is nevertheless seen as conscious of the creation, with a will and purpose that is expressed through messengers recognized in the Baháʼí Faith as the Manifestations of God (all the Jewish prophets, Zoroaster, Krishna, Gautama Buddha, Jesus, Muhammad, the Báb, and ultimately Baháʼu'lláh). The purpose of the creation is for the created to have the capacity to know and love its creator, through such methods as prayer, reflection, and being of service to humankind. God communicates his will and purpose to humanity through his intermediaries, the prophets and messengers who have founded various world religions from the beginning of humankind up to the present day, and will continue to do so in the future.

The Manifestations of God reflect divine attributes, which are creations of God made for the purpose of spiritual enlightenment, onto the physical plane of existence. In the Baháʼí view, all physical beings reflect at least one of these attributes, and the human soul can potentially reflect all of them. The Baháʼí conception of God rejects all pantheistic, anthropomorphic, and incarnationist beliefs about God.

See also

 Ancient Canaanite religion
 Ancient Semitic religion
 Argument from morality
 Atenism
 Comparative religion
 Conceptions of God
 Creationism
 Demiurge
 Dystheism
 Ethical monotheism
 Evil God Challenge
 False god
 Gnosticism
 God of Abraham (Yiddish prayer)
 Mandaeism
 Misotheism
 Moralistic therapeutic deism
 Names of God
 Outline of theology
 Problem of evil
 Problem of Hell
 Religion in pre-Islamic Arabia
 Satanic Verses
 Semitic Neopaganism
 Table of prophets of Abrahamic religions
 Theistic Satanism
 Theodicy
 Urmonotheismus (primitive monotheism)
 Violence in the Bible
 Violence in the Quran

Notes

References

Bibliography

External links

Abrahamic religions
Conceptions of God